Luivienna "Lulu" Statia (born 25 April 1997) is a Curaçaoan football player who plays for BVV Barendrecht. He also holds Dutch citizenship.

Club career
He made his professional debut in the Eerste Divisie for FC Dordrecht on 25 November 2016 in a game against FC Eindhoven.

References

External links
 
 

1997 births
Dutch people of Curaçao descent
Living people
Curaçao footballers
FC Dordrecht players
Excelsior Maassluis players
BVV Barendrecht players
Eerste Divisie players
Tweede Divisie players
Association football defenders